is a former Japanese football player.

Playing career
Kitagawa was born in Kyoto Prefecture on August 21, 1978. After graduating from high school, he joined the Regional Leagues club Sagawa Express Osaka in 1997. In 2000, he moved to the newly promoted J2 League club, Mito HollyHock. He became a regular player as a forward in 2002. In 2004, he moved to the Japan Football League (JFL) club ALO's Hokuriku. He played as a regular player and scored many goals during three seasons. In 2007, he moved to the JFL club Rosso Kumamoto (later Roasso Kumamoto). He played often and the club was promoted to J2 in 2008. However he did not play much after that, and retired at the end of the 2008 season.

Club statistics

References

External links

1978 births
Living people
Association football people from Kyoto Prefecture
Japanese footballers
J2 League players
Japan Football League players
Mito HollyHock players
Kataller Toyama players
Roasso Kumamoto players
Association football forwards